The 1913–14 season was the 43rd season of competitive football in England.

Events
Burnley beat Liverpool 1-0 in the FA Cup final, Blackburn Rovers were the champions

Honours

Notes = Number in parentheses is the times that club has won that honour. * indicates new record for competition

League tables

First Division

Second Division

References